The Intel Pentium brand is a line of mainstream x86-architecture microprocessors from Intel. Processors branded Pentium Processor with MMX Technology (and referred to as Pentium MMX for brevity) are also listed here.

Desktop processors

P5 based Pentiums

"P5" (0.8 μm) 
 Based on P5
 Steppings: B1, C1, D1 (Important Notice: Only D1 stepping processors do not have FDIV bug!)

"P54C" (0.6 μm) 
 Based on P5 microarchitecture
 Steppings: B1, B3, B5, C2, E0  (Important Notice: B5, C2 and E0 stepping processors do not have FDIV bug!)

"P54CQS" (0.35 μm) 
 Based on P5 microarchitecture

"P54CS" (0.35 μm) 
 Based on P5 microarchitecture

"P55C" (0.35 μm) 
 Based on P5 microarchitecture

P6 based Pentiums 

Desktop processors based on the P6 microarchitecture were marketed as Pentium Pro, Pentium II and Pentium III, as well as variations of these names.

NetBurst based Pentiums 

Desktop processors based on the NetBurst microarchitecture were marketed as Pentium 4 and Pentium D.

Core based Pentiums 
Earlier E5xxx desktop processors based on the Core microarchitecture were marketed as Pentium Dual-Core, while later E5xxx and all E6xxx models were named Pentium. Note however, that several resellers will still refer to the newer generation processors as Pentium Dual-Core.

"Allendale", "Conroe" (65 nm)  

The Intel Pentium Dual-Core processors, E2140, E2160, E2180, E2200, and E2220 use the Allendale core, which includes 2 MB of native L2 cache, with half disabled leaving only 1 MB. This compares to the higher end Conroe core which features 4 MB L2 Cache natively. Intel has shifted its product lines having the Core 2 line as Mainstream/Performance, Pentium Dual-Core as Mainstream, and the new Celeron (based on the Conroe-L core) as Budget/Value.

 Based on the 64-bit Core microarchitecture.
All models support: MMX, SSE, SSE2, SSE3, SSSE3, Enhanced Intel SpeedStep Technology (EIST), Intel 64, XD bit (an NX bit implementation)
 Die size: 77 mm² (Allendale-1M), 111 mm² (Allendale), 143 mm² (Conroe)
 Steppings: L2, M0 (Allendale), G0 (Conroe)

"Wolfdale-3M" (45 nm) 

The E5000 series and E6000 series use the same 45 nm Wolfdale-3M core as the E7000 series Core 2s, which has 3 MB L2 cache natively. 1 MB of L2 cache is disabled, for a total of 2 MB L2 cache, or twice the amount in the original Allendale Pentiums. The Wolfdale core is capable of SSE4, but it is disabled in these Pentiums. Pentium E2210 is an OEM processor based on Wolfdale-3M with only 1 MB L2 cache enabled out of the total 3 MB.

 All models support: MMX, SSE, SSE2, SSE3, SSSE3, Enhanced Intel SpeedStep Technology (EIST), Intel 64, XD bit (an NX bit implementation)
 Die size: 82 mm²
 Steppings: R0
 Based on the Penryn microarchitecture
 Part of 3MB L2 Cache Disabled
 E2210 is a Wolfdale-3M with 2MB cache disabled unlike all other E22xx, which are Allendale.
 E5000-series processors were initially known as Pentium Dual-Core, while all later processors were just Pentium.
 E6500K has unlocked multiplier, and is only available in China as limited edition.
 Models with a part number ending in "ML" support Intel VT-x.

Westmere based Pentiums

"Clarkdale" (MCP, 32 nm)

 Note that these are also dual core, but under the Pentium brand.
 Based on Westmere microarchitecture
 All models support: MMX, SSE, SSE2, SSE3, SSSE3, Enhanced Intel SpeedStep Technology (EIST), Intel 64, XD bit (an NX bit implementation), Intel VT-x, Smart Cache.
 Contains 45 nm "Ironlake" GPU.
 G6951 can be unlocked to enable Hyper-threading and an extra 1MB of L3 cache, which are present in the CPU but deliberately disabled, with the purchase of a $50 upgrade card by way of the Intel Upgrade Service.

Sandy Bridge based Pentiums

"Sandy Bridge" (32 nm) 
 All models support: MMX, SSE, SSE2, SSE3, SSSE3, SSE4.1, SSE4.2, Enhanced Intel SpeedStep Technology (EIST), Intel 64, XD bit (an NX bit implementation), Intel VT-x, Smart Cache.
 Pentium G8xx supports DDR3-1333 in addition to DDR3-1066.
 HD Graphics (Sandy Bridge) contain 6 EUs as well as HD Graphics 2000, but does not support the following technologies: Intel Quick Sync Video, InTru3D, Intel Clear Video HD, Wireless display, Intel insider.
 Transistors: 504 million
 Die size: 131 mm²
 The Pentium G622, once upgraded via Intel Upgrade Service, operates at 3.2 GHz, has 3 MB L3 cache and is recognized as Pentium G693.
 The Pentium G632, once upgraded via Intel Upgrade Service, operates at 3.3 GHz, has 3 MB L3 cache and is recognized as Pentium G694.

Ivy Bridge based Pentiums

"Ivy Bridge" (22 nm) 
 All models support: MMX, SSE, SSE2, SSE3, SSSE3, SSE4.1, SSE4.2, Enhanced Intel SpeedStep Technology (EIST), Intel 64, XD bit (an NX bit implementation), Intel VT-x, Smart Cache.
 G20xx support up to DDR3-1333 memory while G21xx support up to DDR3-1600.
 HD Graphics (Ivy Bridge) contain 6 EUs as well as HD Graphics 2500, but does not support the following technologies: Intel Quick Sync Video, InTru3D, Intel Clear Video HD, Wireless display, Intel insider.

Haswell based Pentiums

"Haswell-DT" (22 nm) 
 All models support: MMX, SSE, SSE2, SSE3, SSSE3, SSE4.1, SSE4.2, Enhanced Intel SpeedStep Technology (EIST), Intel 64, XD bit (an NX bit implementation), Intel VT-x, Smart Cache.
 G32xx support up to DDR3-1333 memory while G34xx support up to DDR3-1600.
 G3258 (Pentium anniversary edition) has unlocked CPU multiplier.
 Haswell Pentiums support Quick Sync Video.
 Transistors: 1.4 billion
 Die size: 177mm²

Silvermont based Pentiums

"Bay Trail-D" (22 nm)
 All models support: MMX, SSE, SSE2, SSE3, SSSE3, SSE4.1, SSE4.2, Enhanced Intel SpeedStep Technology (EIST), Intel 64, Intel VT-x.
 GPU and memory controller are integrated onto the processor die
 GPU is based on Ivy Bridge Intel HD Graphics, with 4 execution units, and supports DirectX 11, OpenGL 4.0, OpenGL ES 3.0 and OpenCL 1.1 (on Windows). J2900 supports Intel Quick Sync Video.
 Package size: 25 mm × 27 mm

Airmont based Pentiums

"Braswell" (14 nm)
 All models support: MMX, SSE, SSE2, SSE3, SSSE3, SSE4.1, SSE4.2, Enhanced Intel SpeedStep Technology (EIST), Intel 64, XD bit (an NX bit implementation), Intel VT-x, AES-NI.
 GPU and memory controller are integrated onto the processor die
 GPU is based on Broadwell Intel HD Graphics, with 18 execution units, and supports DirectX 11.2, OpenGL 4.4, OpenGL ES 3.0 and OpenCL 2.0 (on Windows).
 Package size: 25 mm × 27 mm

Skylake based Pentiums

"Skylake-S" (14 nm) 
 All models support: MMX, SSE, SSE2, SSE3, SSSE3, SSE4.1, SSE4.2, Enhanced Intel SpeedStep Technology (EIST), Intel 64, XD bit (an NX bit implementation), Intel VT-x, Intel VT-d, AES-NI, Smart Cache.
 All models support up to DDR3-1600 or DDR4-2133 memory.
 Embedded models support ECC memory.
 Transistors: TBD
 Package size: 37.5 mm x 37.5mm

Goldmont based Pentiums

"Apollo Lake" (14 nm)
 All models support: MMX, SSE, SSE2, SSE3, SSSE3, SSE4.1, SSE4.2, Enhanced Intel SpeedStep Technology (EIST), Intel 64, XD bit (an NX bit implementation), Intel VT-x, AES-NI. TXT/TXE
 Package size: 24 mm × 31 mm
 DDR3L/LPDDR3/LPDDR4 dual-channel memory controller supporting up to 8 GB
 Display controller with 1 MIPI DSI port and 2 DDI ports (eDP 1.3, DP 1.1a, or HDMI 1.4b)
 Integrated Intel HD Graphics (Gen9) GPU
 PCI Express 2.0 controller supporting 6 lanes (3 dedicated and 3 multiplexed with USB 3.0); 4 lanes available externally
 Two USB 3.0 ports (1 dual role, 1 dedicated, 3 multiplexed with PCI Express 2.0 and 1 multiplexed with one SATA-300 port)
 Two USB 2.0 ports
 Two SATA-600 ports (one multiplexed with USB 3.0)
 Integrated HD audio controller
 Integrated image signal processor supporting four MIPI CSI ports and 13 MP sensors
 Integrated memory card reader supporting SDIO 3.01 and eMMC 5.0
 Serial I/O supporting SPI, HSUART (serial port) and I2C

Goldmont Plus based Pentiums

"Gemini Lake" (14 nm)
 All models support: MMX, SSE, SSE2, SSE3, SSSE3, SSE4.1, SSE4.2, Enhanced Intel SpeedStep Technology (EIST), Intel 64, XD bit (an NX bit implementation), Intel VT-x, Intel VT-d, AES-NI, Intel SGX.
 GPU and memory controller are integrated onto the processor die
 GPU is based on Kaby Lake Intel HD Graphics, with 18 execution units, and supports DirectX 12, OpenGL 4.5, OpenGL ES 3.0 and OpenCL 2.0 (on Windows).
 Package size: 25 mm × 24 mm

"Gemini Lake Refresh" (14 nm)
 All models support: MMX, SSE, SSE2, SSE3, SSSE3, SSE4.1, SSE4.2, Enhanced Intel SpeedStep Technology (EIST), Intel 64, XD bit (an NX bit implementation), Intel VT-x, Intel VT-d, AES-NI, Intel SGX.
 GPU and memory controller are integrated onto the processor die
 GPU is based on Kaby Lake Intel HD Graphics, with 18 execution units, and supports DirectX 12, OpenGL 4.5, OpenGL ES 3.0 and OpenCL 2.0 (on Windows).
 Package size: 25 mm × 24 mm
50

Kaby Lake based Pentiums

"Kaby Lake-S" (14 nm) 
 All models support: MMX, SSE, SSE2, SSE3, SSSE3, SSE4.1, SSE4.2, SGX, MPX, Enhanced Intel SpeedStep Technology (EIST), Intel 64, XD bit (an NX bit implementation), Intel VT-x, Intel VT-d, Hyper-threading, AES-NI, Smart Cache, ECC memory.
 All models support up to DDR3-1600 or DDR4-2400 memory.
 Low power models also support configurable TDP (cTDP) down.
 Transistors: TBD
 Package size: 37.5 mm x 37.5mm

Coffee Lake based Pentiums

"Coffee Lake-S" (14 nm) 
 All models support: MMX, SSE, SSE2, SSE3, SSSE3, SSE4.1, SSE4.2, SGX, Enhanced Intel SpeedStep Technology (EIST), Intel 64, XD bit (an NX bit implementation), Intel VT-x, Intel VT-d, Hyper-threading, AES-NI, Smart Cache, ECC memory.
 All models support up to DDR4-2400 memory.
 Low power models also support configurable TDP (cTDP) down.
 Transistors: TBD
 Package size: 37.5 mm x 37.5mm

"Coffee Lake-H" (14 nm)

Comet Lake based Pentiums

"Comet Lake-S" (14 nm) 
 All models support: MMX, SSE, SSE2, SSE3, SSSE3, SSE4.1, SSE4.2, SGX, Enhanced Intel SpeedStep Technology (EIST), Intel 64, XD bit (an NX bit implementation), Intel VT-x, Intel VT-d, Hyper-threading, AES-NI, Smart Cache.
 All models support up to DDR4-2666 memory.
 Low power models also support configurable TDP (cTDP) down.
 Transistors: TBD
 Package size: 37.5 mm x 37.5mm

Golden Cove based Pentiums

"Alder Lake" (Intel 7)
All models support: SSE4.1, SSE4.2, AVX, AVX2, FMA3, Enhanced Intel SpeedStep Technology (EIST), Intel 64, XD bit (an NX bit implementation), Intel VT-x, Intel VT-d, Hyper-threading, AES-NI, Smart Cache, DL Boost, GNA 3.0, and Optane memory.
All models support up to DDR5-4800 or DDR4-3200 memory, and 16 lanes of PCI Express 5.0 + 4 lanes of PCIe 4.0.

Mobile processors

P5 based Pentiums

"P54C" (0.6 μm) 
 Based on P5 microarchitecture

"P54LM" (0.35 μm) 
 Based on P5 microarchitecture

"P55LM" (0.35 μm) 
 Based on P5 microarchitecture

"Tillamook" (0.25 μm) 
 Based on P5 microarchitecture

P6 based Pentiums 

Mobile processors based on the P6 microarchitecture were marketed as Pentium II, Pentium III, Pentium M and Pentium Dual-Core, as well as variations of these names.

NetBurst based Pentiums 

Mobile processors based on the NetBurst microarchitecture were marketed as Pentium 4.

Core based Pentiums 
Prior mobile processors based on the Core microarchitecture were marketed as Pentium Dual-Core, while the current models are named Pentium. Note however, that several resellers will still refer to them as Pentium Dual-Core.

"Yonah" (65 nm)
 Based on the 32-bit Enhanced Pentium M microarchitecture
 All models support: MMX, SSE, SSE2, SSE3, Enhanced Intel SpeedStep Technology (EIST), XD bit (an NX bit implementation)
 Die size: 90.3 mm²
 Steppings: D0
 T2060 debuted on January 30, 2007 in notebooks only sold as part of Windows Vista launch bundles; it appears to be OEM-only.
 T2060 & T2080 were discovered to be an Intel Core T2050 & T2250 with half the L2 cache (old versions of CPU-Z identified them as T2050 & T2250)

"Merom-M", "Merom-2M" (65 nm)  
 Based on the 64-bit Core microarchitecture
All models support: MMX, SSE, SSE2, SSE3, SSSE3, Enhanced Intel SpeedStep Technology (EIST), Intel 64, XD bit (an NX bit implementation)
 Die size: 111 mm²
 Steppings: M0

"Penryn-3M", "Penryn-L" (45 nm) 

 Based on the 64-bit Penryn microarchitecture
All models support: MMX, SSE, SSE2, SSE3, SSSE3, Enhanced Intel SpeedStep Technology (EIST), Intel 64, XD bit (an NX bit implementation)
 Die size: 82 mm²
 Steppings: R0

Note: The Pentium SU2X00 series processors have a single core, not two, according to Intel's website.

Westmere based Pentiums

"Arrandale" (MCP, 32 nm) 

 Based on Westmere microarchitecture
 All models support: MMX, SSE, SSE2, SSE3, SSSE3, Enhanced Intel SpeedStep Technology (EIST), Intel 64, XD bit (an NX bit implementation), Smart Cache
 FSB has been replaced with DMI.
 Contains 45 nm "Ironlake" GPU HD Graphics.
 Die size: 81 mm²
 Transistors: 382 million
 Graphics and Integrated Memory Controller die size: 114 mm²
 Transistors: 177 million
 Stepping: C2, K0

Sandy Bridge based Pentiums

"Sandy Bridge" (32 nm) 
 All models support: MMX, SSE, SSE2, SSE3, SSSE3, SSE4.1, SSE4.2, Enhanced Intel SpeedStep Technology (EIST), Intel 64, XD bit (an NX bit implementation), Smart Cache.
 HD Graphics (Sandy Bridge) contain 6 EUs as well as HD Graphics 2000, but does not support the following technologies: Intel Quick Sync Video, InTru 3D, Clear Video HD, Wireless Display, Intel Insider.
 Transistors: 504 million
 Die size: 131 mm²

Ivy Bridge based Pentiums

"Ivy Bridge" (22 nm) 
 All models support: MMX, SSE, SSE2, SSE3, SSSE3, SSE4.1, SSE4.2, Enhanced Intel SpeedStep Technology (EIST), Intel 64, XD bit (an NX bit implementation), Intel VT-x, Smart Cache.
 HD Graphics (Ivy Bridge) contain 6 EUs as well as HD Graphics 2500, but does not support the following technologies: Intel Quick Sync Video, InTru 3D, Clear Video HD, Wireless Display, Intel Insider.
 Transistors: 1.4 billion
 Die size: 160 mm²

Haswell based Pentiums

"Haswell-MB" (22 nm) 
 All models support: MMX, SSE, SSE2, SSE3, SSSE3, SSE4.1, SSE4.2, Enhanced Intel SpeedStep Technology (EIST), Intel 64, XD bit (an NX bit implementation), Intel VT-x, Smart Cache.
 Transistors: 1.3 billion
 Die size: 181 mm²

"Haswell-ULT" (SiP, 22 nm) 

 All models support: MMX, SSE, SSE2, SSE3, SSSE3, SSE4.1, SSE4.2, Enhanced Intel SpeedStep Technology (EIST), Intel 64, XD bit (an NX bit implementation), Intel VT-x, Smart Cache.
 3558U also supports Intel Wireless Display.
 Transistors: 1.3 billion
 Die size: 181 mm²

"Haswell-ULX" (SiP, 22 nm) 
 All models support: MMX, SSE, SSE2, SSE3, SSSE3, SSE4.1, SSE4.2, Enhanced Intel SpeedStep Technology (EIST), Intel 64, XD bit (an NX bit implementation), Intel VT-x, Smart Cache.
 3561Y also supports Intel Wireless Display.
 Transistors: 1.3 billion
 Die size: 181 mm²

"Broadwell-U" (14 nm) 
 All models support: MMX, SSE, SSE2, SSE3, SSSE3, SSE4.1, SSE4.2, Enhanced Intel SpeedStep Technology (EIST), Intel 64, XD bit (an NX bit implementation), Intel VT-x, Intel VT-d, Smart Cache, Intel Wireless Display, and configurable TDP (cTDP) down
 3825U also supports Hyper-threading.
 Transistors: 1.3 billion
 Die size: 82 mm²

Silvermont based Pentiums

"Bay Trail-M" (22 nm)
 All models support: MMX, SSE, SSE2, SSE3, SSSE3, SSE4.1, SSE4.2, Enhanced Intel SpeedStep Technology (EIST), Intel 64, XD bit (an NX bit implementation), Intel VT-x.
 GPU and memory controller are integrated onto the processor die
 GPU is based on Ivy Bridge Intel HD Graphics, with 4 execution units, and supports DirectX 11, OpenGL 4.0, OpenGL ES 3.0 and OpenCL 1.1 (on Windows). N3530 and N3540 support Intel Quick Sync Video.
 Package size: 25 mm × 27 mm
 Transistors: 960 million
 Die size: 130 mm²

Airmont based Pentiums

"Braswell" (14 nm)
 All models support: MMX, SSE, SSE2, SSE3, SSSE3, SSE4.1, SSE4.2, Enhanced Intel SpeedStep Technology (EIST), Intel 64, XD bit (an NX bit implementation), Intel VT-x, AES-NI.
 GPU and memory controller are integrated onto the processor die
 GPU is based on Broadwell Intel HD Graphics, with 16 execution units, and supports DirectX 11.2, OpenGL 4.3, OpenGL ES 3.0 and OpenCL 1.2 (on Windows).
 Package size: 25 mm × 27 mm

Skylake based Pentiums

"Skylake-U" (14 nm) 
 All models support: MMX, SSE, SSE2, SSE3, SSSE3, SSE4.1, SSE4.2, Hyper-threading, Enhanced Intel SpeedStep Technology (EIST), Intel 64, XD bit (an NX bit implementation), Intel VT-x, Intel VT-d, AES-NI, Smart Cache, Intel Wireless Display, and configurable TDP (cTDP) down
 GPU supports DirectX 12, OpenGL 4.4 and Intel Quick Sync Video.

"Skylake-Y" (14 nm) 
 All models support: MMX, SSE, SSE2, SSE3, SSSE3, SSE4.1, SSE4.2, Hyper-threading, Enhanced Intel SpeedStep Technology (EIST), Intel 64, XD bit (an NX bit implementation), Intel VT-x, Intel VT-d, AES-NI, Smart Cache, Intel Wireless Display, and configurable TDP (cTDP) down
 GPU supports DirectX 12, OpenGL 4.4 and Intel Quick Sync Video.

Goldmont based Pentiums

"Apollo Lake" (14 nm)
 All models support: MMX, SSE, SSE2, SSE3, SSSE3, SSE4.1, SSE4.2, Enhanced Intel SpeedStep Technology (EIST), Intel 64, XD bit (an NX bit implementation), Intel VT-x, Intel VT-d, AES-NI.
 GPU and memory controller are integrated onto the processor die
 GPU is based on Skylake Intel HD Graphics, with 18 execution units, and supports DirectX 12, OpenGL 4.5, OpenGL ES 3.0, OpenCL 1.2 (on Windows) and Intel Quick Sync Video.
 Package size: 24 mm × 31 mm

Goldmont Plus based Pentiums

"Gemini Lake" (14 nm)
 All models support: MMX, SSE, SSE2, SSE3, SSSE3, SSE4.1, SSE4.2, Enhanced Intel SpeedStep Technology (EIST), Intel 64, XD bit (an NX bit implementation), Intel VT-x, Intel VT-d, AES-NI, Intel SGX.
 GPU and memory controller are integrated onto the processor die
 GPU is based on Kaby Lake Intel HD Graphics, with 18 execution units, and supports DirectX 12, OpenGL 4.5, OpenGL ES 3.0 and OpenCL 1.2 (on Windows).
 Package size: 25 mm × 24 mm

"Gemini Lake Refresh" (14 nm)
 All models support: MMX, SSE, SSE2, SSE3, SSSE3, SSE4.1, SSE4.2, Enhanced Intel SpeedStep Technology (EIST), Intel 64, XD bit (an NX bit implementation), Intel VT-x, Intel VT-d, AES-NI, Intel SGX.
 GPU and memory controller are integrated onto the processor die
 GPU is based on Kaby Lake Intel HD Graphics, with 18 execution units, and supports DirectX 12, OpenGL 4.5, OpenGL ES 3.0 and OpenCL 1.2 (on Windows).
 Package size: 25 mm × 24 mm

Kaby Lake based Pentiums

"Kaby Lake-U" (14 nm) 
 All models support: MMX, SSE, SSE2, SSE3, SSSE3, SSE4.1, SSE4.2, SGX, MPX, Hyper-threading, Enhanced Intel SpeedStep Technology (EIST), Intel 64, XD bit (an NX bit implementation), Intel VT-x, Intel VT-d, AES-NI, Smart Cache, and configurable TDP (cTDP) down.

Note: Pentium 4415U was renamed to Pentium Gold 4415U (end 2017).

"Kaby Lake-Y" (14 nm) 
 All models support: MMX, SSE, SSE2, SSE3, SSSE3, SSE4.1, SSE4.2, SGX, MPX, Hyper-threading, Enhanced Intel SpeedStep Technology (EIST), Intel 64, XD bit (an NX bit implementation), Intel VT-x, Intel VT-d, AES-NI, Smart Cache, and configurable TDP (cTDP) down.

"Kaby Lake Refresh" (14 nm) 
 All models support: MMX, SSE, SSE2, SSE3, SSSE3, SSE4.1, SSE4.2, SGX, MPX, Hyper-threading, Enhanced Intel SpeedStep Technology (EIST), Intel 64, XD bit (an NX bit implementation), Intel VT-x, Intel VT-d, AES-NI, Smart Cache, and configurable TDP (cTDP) down.

"Amber Lake-Y" (14 nm) 
 All models support: MMX, SSE, SSE2, SSE3, SSSE3, SSE4.1, SSE4.2, SGX, MPX, Hyper-threading, Enhanced Intel SpeedStep Technology (EIST), Intel 64, XD bit (an NX bit implementation), Intel VT-x, Intel VT-d, AES-NI, Smart Cache, and configurable TDP (cTDP) down.
 Pentium Gold 6500Y also support: AVX, AVX2, FMA3, Turbo Boost, and configurable TDP (cTDP) up.

Coffee Lake based Pentiums

"Whiskey Lake-U" (14 nm)

Comet Lake based Pentiums

"Comet Lake-U" (14 nm)

Ice Lake based Pentiums

"Ice Lake-U" (10 nm)

Tiger Lake based Pentiums

"Tiger Lake-UP3" (10 nm SuperFin) 
 All models support: SSE4.1, SSE4.2, AVX2, FMA3, Speed Shift Technology (SST), Intel 64, Intel VT-x, Intel VT-d, Turbo Boost, Hyper-threading, AES-NI, Smart Cache, DL Boost, Optane memory, GNA 2.0, IPU6, TB4.

Tremont based Pentiums

"Jasper Lake" (10 nm)
 All models support: MMX, SSE, SSE2, SSE3, SSSE3, SSE4.1, SSE4.2, Enhanced Intel SpeedStep Technology (EIST), Intel 64, XD bit (an NX bit implementation), Intel VT-x, Intel VT-d, AES-NI, Intel SHA Extensions, MBEC, SMAP/SMEP
 Package size: 35 mm x 24 mm
 DDR4/LPDDR4 dual-channel memory controller supporting up to 16 GB
 Display controller with 1 MIPI DSI 1.2 port and 3 DDI ports (eDP 1.4b, MIPI DSI 1.2, DP 1.4a, or HDMI 2.0b)
 Integrated Intel HD Graphics (Gen11) GPU
 PCI Express 3.0 controller supporting 8 lanes (multiplexed); 4 lanes available externally
 Two USB 3.2 2x1 ports (a.k.a. USB 3.1)
 Four USB 3.2 1x1 ports (a.k.a. USB 3.0)
 Eight USB 2.0 ports
 Two SATA-600 ports
 Integrated HD audio controller
 Integrated image signal processor supporting four cameras (three concurrent)
 Integrated memory card reader supporting SDIO 3.0 and eMMC 5.1
 Serial I/O supporting SPI, HSUART (serial port) and I2C
 Integrated CNVi with Wi-Fi 6 (IEEE 802.11ax 1x1 and 2x2) and Bluetooth 5.x (using UART/I2S/USB2)

Alder Lake based Pentiums

"Alder Lake-U" (Intel 7) 
 All models support: SSE4.1, SSE4.2, AVX, AVX2, FMA3, Speed Shift Technology (SST), Intel 64, Intel VT-x, Intel VT-d, Hyper-threading, Turbo Boost, AES-NI, IPU6 (except SRLFV), TB4, Smart Cache, Thread Director, DL Boost, and GNA 3.0.
 Support 20 lanes (UP3) or 14 lanes (UP4) of PCI Express 4.0/3.0.
 All models support up to LPDDR5-5200 or LPDDR4X-4266 memory
 Standard power models also support up to DDR5-4800 or DDR4-3200 memory.

Server processors

Sandy Bridge based Pentiums

"Sandy Bridge" (32 nm) 
 All models support: MMX, SSE, SSE2, SSE3, SSSE3, SSE4.1, SSE4.2, Enhanced Intel SpeedStep Technology (EIST), Intel 64, XD bit (an NX bit implementation), Intel VT-x, Smart Cache, Hyper-threading.
 No models include HD Graphics.
 Transistors: 624 or 504 million
 Die size: 149 or 131 mm2

"Sandy Bridge-EN" (32 nm) 
 Based on Sandy Bridge-E CPU.
 All models support: MMX, SSE, SSE2, SSE3, SSSE3, SSE4.1, SSE4.2, AVX, Enhanced Intel SpeedStep Technology (EIST), Intel 64, XD bit (an NX bit implementation), TXT, Intel VT-x, Intel VT-d, AES-NI, Smart Cache.

Ivy Bridge based Pentiums

"Ivy Bridge-EN" (22 nm) 
 All models support: MMX, SSE, SSE2, SSE3, SSSE3, SSE4.1, SSE4.2, AVX, F16C, Enhanced Intel SpeedStep Technology (EIST), Intel 64, XD bit (an NX bit implementation), TXT, Intel VT-x, Intel EPT, Intel VT-d, Intel VT-c, Intel x8 SDDC, AES-NI, Smart Cache.
 Support for up to 6 DIMMS of DDR3 memory.

Broadwell based Pentiums

"Broadwell-DE" (14 nm, SoC) 
 All models support: MMX, SSE, SSE2, SSE3, SSSE3, SSE4.1, SSE4.2, AVX, F16C, Enhanced Intel SpeedStep Technology (EIST), Intel 64, XD bit (an NX bit implementation), TXT, Intel VT-x, Intel EPT, Intel VT-d, AES-NI, Smart Cache, ECC memory.
 D1508, D1517, D1519 also support Hyper-threading, Turbo Boost.
 SoC peripherals include 8 × USB (4 × 2.0, 4 × 3.0), 6 × SATA, 2 × Integrated 10 GbE LAN, UART, GPIO, and 32 lanes of PCI Express (8 × 2.0, 24 × 3.0), in ×16, ×8 and ×4 configurations.
 Support for up to four DIMMs of DDR4 or DDR3L memory per CPU socket.

Embedded processors

Sandy Bridge based Pentiums

"Gladden" (32 nm) 

 All models support: MMX, SSE, SSE2, SSE3, SSSE3, SSE4.1, SSE4.2, AVX, Enhanced Intel SpeedStep Technology (EIST), Intel 64, XD bit (an NX bit implementation), Intel VT-x, EPT, Hyper-threading, Smart Cache, ECC memory.
 Transistors:
 Die size:

"Gladden" (22 nm)

Tremont based Pentiums

"Elkhart Lake" (10 nm SuperFin)
 All models support: MMX, SSE, SSE2, SSE3, SSSE3, SSE4.1, SSE4.2, Intel 64, XD bit (an NX bit implementation), Intel VT-x, Intel VT-d, AES-NI.
 GPU is based on Gen11 Intel HD Graphics, with up to 32 execution units, and supports up to 3 displays (4K @ 60 Hz) through HDMI, DP, eDP, or DSI.
 SoC peripherals include 4 × USB 2.0/3.0/3.1, 2 × SATA,  3 × 2.5GbE LAN, UART, and up to 8 lanes of PCI Express 3.0 in x4, x2, and x1 configurations.
 Package size: 35 mm × 24 mm

See also 
 Pentium
 List of Intel processors
 Comparison of Intel processors
Legacy architectures:
 List of Intel Pentium Pro processors
 List of Intel Pentium II processors
 List of Intel Pentium III processors
 List of Intel Pentium 4 processors
 List of Intel Pentium D processors
 List of Intel Pentium M processors
 List of Intel Core processors
 List of Intel Core 2 processors
Current architectures:
 List of Intel Celeron processors
 List of Intel Core i3 processors
 List of Intel Core i5 processors
 List of Intel Core i7 processors
 List of Intel Core i9 processors

References

External links 
 Search MDDS Database
 Intel ARK Database
 Intel Pentium processor for desktop product order codes
 Intel Pentium processor for mobile product order codes

Pentium
Intel Pentium